Selfie with Bajrangi is an action-comedy animation TV series set in a small town in contemporary India produced by Cosmos-Maya. The series premiered on Amazon Prime on 6 October 2017. The series was later acquired by Disney India and was syndicated on Hungama TV and Disney Channel (India). In 2020 Disney India Commissioned 342 episodes for streaming service Disney+ Hotstar. The show is also available in Tamil and Telugu.

Synopsis 
Set in the contemporary times in a small town named Funnipura, in Northern India, Ankush's life changes when he meets a mysterious nine-year-old child named Bajrangi, who is visible to nobody but him (Bajrangi is  an incarnation of Bajrang Bali, the biggest devotee of Shri Ram, also Known As Lord Hanuman) . Ankush is often bullied by his classmate Ranga and his assistants, Minus 1 and Minus 2. Bajrangi always helps Ankush. One of Ankush's classmates, Renu also supports Ankush. Ranga's father Totaram, is a big businessman and his assistants One 3 and Two 4, who commit illegal works, along with Totaram's brother-in-law Sotaram. However, those are stopped by Ankush and Bajrangi directly or indirectly. They together fight against evil, and each episode ends with Ankush taking a selfie with Bajrangi and/or few characters.

Characters
 Bajrangi: Lord Hanuman who is the saviour of the entire world. Due to the pious nature of Ankush he accepted him as his devotee and friend. He is invisible to all except Ankush and to the animals. He has accepted Ankush's parents as his own parents. He saves Ankush and all the citizens of the place from danger. / Bajrangi The Robot: Lord Hanuman, turned Robot, which is invented by Satellite Baba to save the world from every hazard. (Season 4)
 Ankush: 8–9 years old kid studying in 2nd or 3rd grade. Most of the time, Ankush found himself in trouble dealing with daily things and being bullied by the guy called Ranga, but is always saved by Bajrangi.
 Geeta: Ankush’s mother
 Vinod: Ankush’s father 
 Ranga: Ankush’s classmate who often bullies him, and son of Totaram and Maina devi, and nephew of Sotaram and Dhotaram.
 Minus 1: Ranga’s Assistant #1. He always wear badge "-1".
 Minus 2: Ranga’s Assistant #2. He always wear badge "-2".
 Renu: Ankush’s best friend & classmate.
 Chunnu: Ankush’s friend & classmate.
 Totaram: Ranga's father, a villain who likes to loot people in different ways, and also the younger brother of Dhotaram.
 Sotaram: Totaram’s brother in law who is a huge sleepyhead.
 Dhotaram: Totaram’s brother who is very skilled in wrestling and likes Ankush. He is very kind in nature.
 Maina Devi: Totaram’s wife who has two maids who are probably One 3 and Two 4's wife and Minus 1 and Minus 2's mothers.
 One 3: Totaram’s bodyguard #1
 Two 4: Totaram’s bodyguard #2
 Tainat Singh: A police officer (perhaps retired) who owns a moped. He constantly sees Ankush flying (while playing with Bajrangi) and gets struck by a mysterious lightning cloud.
 Inspector Happy Singh: A jolly inspector who trusts Ankush a lot.
 Satellite Baba: A scientist, who helps Ankush to save the world by inventing different kinds of gadgets.

References 

2017 Indian television series debuts
Indian children's animated action television series
Indian children's animated comedy television series
Hungama TV original programming
Amazon Prime Video original programming
Animated television series by Amazon Studios
Hindi-language Disney+ Hotstar original programming
Hanuman in popular culture